Bairagimadam Temple is a Hindu temple located in Muthialpet, Parry's corner (Old: George Town) neighbourhood, in the city of Chennai, India. The temples was constructed in the 17th century by Ketti Narayana, a son of Beri Thimappa and dedicated to Venkateswara. It is opined that the Bairagimadam temple might be the one mentioned as "Lorraine's Pagoda", Lorraine being a corruption of Narayana, in the British maps of the 17th and 18th centuries.

References 

 

Hindu temples in Chennai